This is a list of airports in Nicaragua, sorted by location. 



List

See also 

 Transport in Nicaragua
 List of airports by ICAO code: M#MN - Nicaragua
 Wikipedia: WikiProject Aviation/Airline destination lists: North America#Nicaragua

External links 

Empresa Administradora de Aeropuertos Internacionales (EAAI) 
Publicación de Información Aeronáutica de la República de Nicaragua
 Lists of airports in Nicaragua:
 Ometepe Island Flights
 Great Circle Mapper
 Aircraft Charter World
 The Airport Guide
 World Aero Data
 A-Z World Airports
 FallingRain.com

References

 
Nicaragua
Airports
Airports
Nicaragua